Junta de Aviación Civil de la República Dominicana (JAC) is the civil aviation authority of the Dominican Republic. Its headquarters is in Gazcue, Santo Domingo. As of 2012, Engineer Luís P. Rodríguez Ariza is the president of the JAC.

On December 28, 2006 Law 491/06 was established; the elements of Law 491/06 currently govern civil aviation in the Dominican Republic.

References

External links

 Junta de Aviación Civil 

Government of the Dominican Republic
Dominican Republic
Aviation organizations based in the Dominican Republic